Andri Ragettli (born 21 August 1998) is a Swiss freestyle skier. He has won ten world cup titles and five crystal globes, including slopestyle in 2016, 2018, 2020 and 2022, as well as big air in 2019. He represented Switzerland in slopestyle at the 2018 Winter Olympics in Pyeongchang, where he qualified for the final, along with two fellow Swiss skiers, and finished 7th. Andri won his first X-Games gold medal at X-Games Norway 2020, which was his childhood dream. Since then he has added two more X-Games gold medals: one in big air (2021) and one in Slopestyle (2022). At the 2022 Winter Olympics in Beijing he qualified in first place for slopestyle finals but ended up 4th in the end.

He is the first skier to perform a quad cork 1800 on skis. At the 2019 Audi Nines he became the second person to perform a quad cork 1980 on skis, after fellow Swiss skier Fabian Bösch.

Works 

 Attack your dreams, Giger Verlag, 2022.

References

ce

External links

1998 births
Living people
X Games athletes
Swiss male freestyle skiers
Freestyle skiers at the 2018 Winter Olympics
Freestyle skiers at the 2022 Winter Olympics
Olympic freestyle skiers of Switzerland
21st-century Swiss people